SH1 is a Paralympic shooting classification.

Sport
Athletes in this Paralympic shooting sport class either shoot with a pistol or a rifle. They do not require a shooting stand, because their arms are affected by impairment to a lesser extent and allow for sufficient support of the pistol or rifle. Eligible pistol shooters, for example, have an impaired non-shooting arm, such as amputation or muscle weakness.

Becoming classified
Sub-classifications A, B and C define wheelchair backrest height depending on back and pelvic strength per athlete. Ambulant or wheelchair using shooters regardless of sub-classifications A, B or C shoot together in this class.

Classification is handled by International Paralympic Committee Shooting.

IPC Shooting Classification Rules and Regulations
The IPC Shooting Classification Rules and Regulations were published and came into force in May 2012.  The rules reflect the wording of the IPC Classification Code and are a revised version of the previous IPC Classification Rules.

See also 

 SH2 (classification)
 Para-shooting classification

References

External links
IPC Shooting - Classification
IPC Shooting - Official Website

Parasports classifications
Shooting at the Summer Paralympics